Megawatt Valley is a term applied to a geographic location which houses a large number of electricity generating stations.  Historically in the United Kingdom this applied to the coal-fired power stations of the lower Trent Valley.  In the mid-1980s, the valley's 13 facilities generated up to a quarter of the power demand for England and Wales.  A shift to gas-fired power stations saw many of the Megawatt Valley facilities close down.  The term was then associated with an area of Yorkshire centred on the River Aire that was home to Ferrybridge C, Eggborough and Drax power stations.  Of these facilities only Drax remains in operation.  In the United States the term has been applied to an area of West Virginia, home to five power stations.

Trent Valley 

Megawatt Valley was a term originally applied to the Trent Valley.  The area was developed in the 1960s by the nationalised Central Electricity Generating Board (CEGB).  Many coal power stations were constructed on or near the banks of the River Trent and a major overhead power line network was constructed to supply Southern England.  This construction coincided with a move by CEGB to shift the location of power generation from smaller city-based power stations to rural locations.  These were more efficient as they could be larger, closer to fuel sources and cooling water supplies.  The Trent Valley was ideal due its proximity to the Nottinghamshire and Yorkshire coal fields and ready supply of water from the Trent.

Power stations in Megawatt Valley included High Marnham in Nottinghamshire which, at 1000MW, was the largest power station in Europe when it was opened in October 1962, and was fed by 17 different collieries.  In 1986 the valley was home to 13 of the 78 power stations in England and Wales and was responsible for up to a quarter of all power generated in the same area.  This was the largest concentration of power generation in Europe.  It was said that by the late 1960s the waters of the Trent were noticeably warmer than those of comparable rivers owing to heat transfer from the cooling water.

The sculpture Power in Trust by Norman Sillman, made to represent a hand made from boiler pipes and a turbine, was commissioned in 1961 for the opening of Staythorpe B Power Station.  It remains on the site of the former coal-fired power station and has been described as a monument to the pioneers of Megawatt Valley.  The five surviving cooling towers at the long-closed Willington Power Station were preserved from demolition due to the presence of nesting birds. They remain a notable landmark to travellers along the Trent and have been cited as a monument to the importance of the Trent to Megawatt Valley.

A 1989 paper written by the Chairman of East Midlands Electricity, then on the brink of privatisation, stated that until that point British electricity generation had relied on large-scale coal plant as seen at Megawatt Valley.  He provided a vision of the future where generation moved away from coal to cheaper means, such as gas.  This switch began to be made in the 1990s, during the so-called Dash for Gas, and led to the closure of many coal-fired plants, including those in Megawatt Valley.  Only Ratcliffe-on-Soar, and West Burton remain in service of the coal-fired power stations in the Megawatt Valley (as of 2020).  These plants have flue-gas desulphurisation units which supply gypsum for plasterboard manufacture.  The pulverised fly ash (PFA) generated by the power stations was, until the 1980s, used to fill the majority of sand and gravel workings in the Trent Valley.  This practice reduced following the wider use of in manufacture and the closure of Megawatt Valley power stations.

There remains a concern amongst some residents that the old coal power stations will be replaced by other forms of generation such as wind turbines and that Megawatt Valley will continue to be viewed as a place where visual intrusion by energy assets is acceptable.

List of coal power stations in the lower Trent Valley 

Richard Stone, in his book The River Trent (2005), provides the limits of Megawatt Valley as Meaford – near Stone, Staffordshire – at the upstream end and Keadby – near Scunthorpe, Lincolnshire at the downstream end.  This includes the following coal-fired power stations – some of these sites have had gas-fired units installed, these are not listed.

Staffordshire 
Meaford A (1948–1974)
Meaford B (1957–1990)
Rugeley A (1961–1995)
Rugeley B (1970–2016)
Burton upon Trent (1894–1976)

Derbyshire 
Drakelow A (1955–1984)
Drakelow B (1960–1993)
Drakelow C (1964–2003)
Willington A (1957–1994)
Willington B (1960–1999)

Leicestershire 
Castle Donington (1958–1995)

Nottinghamshire 
Ratcliffe-on-Soar (1968–)
Wilford (1925–1981)
Holme Pierrepoint (proposed 1960, not built)
Staythorpe A (1950–1983)
Staythorpe B (1962–1994)
High Marnham (1962–2003)
Cottam (1968–2019)
West Burton (1966–)

Lincolnshire 
Keadby (1952–1984)
Upstream of Richard Stone's geographical limit at Meaford is Stoke-on-Trent power station (1913–1960s), located adjacent to the river Trent.

Later use of the term 

After many of the Trent Valley power stations closed the epithet Megawatt Valley began to be used for a section of Yorkshire between Leeds, York and Doncaster.  This was due to the presence of Ferrybridge C (1966–2016), Eggborough (1967–2018) and Drax (1974–) coal-fired power stations.  This was one of the few remaining concentrations of coal-fired generation in the UK; the power stations being located close to historic coal-mining sites on the South Yorkshire Coalfield and to the River Aire.  Drax is a large power station capable of generating 7% of UK electricity demand and, despite being the UK's cleanest and most-efficient coal-fired power station is Europe's biggest single source of carbon dioxide emissions.  The term Megawatt Valley, in relation to the Yorkshire power stations, has been mentioned ("What ever happened to The Megawatt Valley? It pumped out the sounds to the avenues and alleys") in the song Two Lane Texaco by the folk band My Darling Clementine.

The term has also been used in reference to a location in West Virginia, United States, where five plants are located, totalling some 6000 megawatts of generating capacity.  This includes the Mountaineer Power Plant, in Mason County and four nearby plants.

References 

Electric power infrastructure in England
Power stations in the East Midlands
River Trent
Science and technology in Nottinghamshire